Rukhsana is a 1955 Indian Hindi-language film starring Meena Kumari, Kishore Kumar in lead roles. The film was directed by R.C. Talwar who was also its writer and producer.

Plot
The film is a fantasy drama revolving a kingdom ruled by a fickle-minded king whose daughter Rukhsana falls in love with a rebel. The story progresses with an evil vizer who not only eyes the throne but also the young princess and makes her life a living hell. In the climax the two lovers overcome all the tribulations and unite again.

Cast
 Meena Kumari
 Kishore Kumar
 Shammi
 Amar
 Sunder
 Kumkum
 Randhir
 Madan Puri (guest appearance)

Crew
Director – R. C. Talwar
Producer – R. C. Talwar	
Story – R.C. Talwar
Cinematography	– Prakash Malhotra
Art Director – Kanu Desai
Music – Sajjad Hussain
Lyrics – Shakeel Badayuni, Tanveer Naqvi, Khumar Barabankavi
Playback Singers – Mubarak Begum, Lata Mangeshkar, Asha Bhosle, Kishore Kumar

Soundtrack
The film had five songs in it. The music of the film was composed by Sajjad Hussain. Shakeel Badayuni, Tanveer Naqvi and Khumar Barabankavi penned down the lyrics.

Reception
The film opened to negative reviews with the critics criticising the stereotypical script. However the lead actors Meena Kumari and Kishore Kumar were praised for their respective performances.

References

1950s Hindi-language films
Indian swashbuckler films
Indian black-and-white films